Turrella letourneuxiana is a species of sea snail, a marine gastropod mollusk in the family Clathurellidae.

Description
The length of the shell attains 11 mm.

The color of the shell is yellowish brown, or light reddish brown.

Distribution
This species is endemic to Australia and occurs off Tasmania, Victoria and New South Wales.

References

 Crosse, H. & Fischer, P. 1865. Description d'espèces nouvelles d'Australie provenant dela collection de M. Geo French Angas. Journal de Conchyliologie 13: 422–429, pl. 11, figs 1-7
 Angas, G.F. 1867. A list of species of marine Mollusca found in Port Jackson harbour, New South Wales, and on the adjacent coasts, with notes on their habits, etc. Part I. Proceedings of the Zoological Society of London 1867: 185–233 
 Hutton, F.W. (ed.) 1873. Catalogue of the marine Mollusca of New Zealand, with diagnoses of species. Wellington : Government Printer 116 pp.
 Verco, J.C. 1909. Notes on South Australian marine Mollusca with descriptions of new species. Part XII. Transactions of the Royal Society of South Australia 33: 293–342 
 Laseron, C. 1954. Revision of the New South Wales Turridae (Mollusca). Australian Zoological Handbook. Sydney : Royal Zoological Society of New South Wales pp. 56, pls 1–12.
 Hedley, C. 1922. A revision of the Australian Turridae. Records of the Australian Museum 13(6): 213–359, pls 42–56 
 Powell, A.W.B. 1966. The molluscan families Speightiidae and Turridae, an evaluation of the valid taxa, both Recent and fossil, with list of characteristic species. Bulletin of the Auckland Institute and Museum. Auckland, New Zealand 5: 1–184, pls 1–23

External links
 
 Gastropods.com: Turrella letourneuxiana
 MNHN, Paris: specimen

letourneuxiana
Gastropods described in 1865
Gastropods of Australia